Edward Ermatinger (February 1797 – October 1876) was a Canadian fur trader, businessman and political figure.

Biography
He was born on the isle of Elba in 1797, as his father, Lawrence Edward Ermatinger, was a commissary officer in the British Army. His grandfather was the Swiss-born merchant, Lawrence Ermatinger (1736-1789). His mother, of Italian origin, died when he was an infant. 

He was educated in England and went to York Factory in 1818 with his brother Francis as a clerk for the Hudson's Bay Company. He served with the company until 1828 in what is now Manitoba and the Columbia district. He visited England in 1828 and then returned to Upper Canada the following year. He settled in St. Thomas, where he served as postmaster, reeve, owned a general store and was manager for the Bank of Upper Canada, then the Commercial Bank and finally the Bank of Montreal. He was elected to the Legislative Assembly of the Province of Canada for Middlesex in 1844 as a Conservative. He was editor and owner of the St. Thomas Standard. In 1851, he helped found the Bank of the County of Elgin. Ermatinger published The Hudson’s Bay territories; a series of letters on this important question in 1858 and an autobiography of Colonel Talbot in 1859. He was a member of the Church of England, a Freemason and a fervent anti-Catholic.

Ermatinger died at St. Thomas in 1876.

His uncle, Charles Oakes Ermatinger (1776-1833), was also a member of the Hudson's Bay Company. His son Charles Oaks served in the Legislative Assembly of Ontario.

References

 Munnick, Harriet D. "Edward and Francis Ermatinger", featured in "Trappers of the Far West", Leroy R. Hafen, editor.  1972, Arthur H. Clark Company, reprint University of Nebraska Press, October 1983.

Bibliography

 Ermatinger, Edward. Life of Colonel Talbot, and the Talbot Settlement Its Rise and Progress, with Sketches of the Public Characters, and Career of Some of the Most Conspicuous Men in Upper Canada, Who Were Either Friends or Acquaintances of the Subjects of These Memoirs. St. Thomas, Ont.?: s.n, 1982. 
 Ermatinger, Edward. The Hudson's Bay Territories A Series of Letters on This Important Question. Toronto?: s.n.], 1858. 
 Ermatinger, Edward, C. O. Ermatinger, and James White. Edward Ermatinger's York Factory Express Journal, Being a Record of Journeys Made between Fort Vancouver and Hudson Bay in the Years 1827-1828. 1912.

Further reading

 McDonald, Lois Halliday, Edward Ermatinger, and Francis Ermatinger. Fur Trade Letters of Francis Ermatinger Written to His Brother Edward During His Service with the Hudson's Bay Company, 1818-1853. Northwest historical series, 15. Glendale, Calif: A.H. Clark Co, 1980.

External links
Biography at the Dictionary of Canadian Biography Online
Friends and other HBC Colleagues -Edward Ermatinger
Life of Colonel Talbot and the Talbot settlement, E. Ermatinger

1797 births
1876 deaths
People from the Province of Livorno
Canadian fur traders
Members of the Legislative Assembly of the Province of Canada from Canada West
Mayors of St. Thomas, Ontario
Canadian people of Swiss descent
Italian emigrants to Canada